Oocorys verrillii is a species of large sea snail, a marine gastropod mollusc in the family Cassidae, the helmet snails and bonnet snails.

Description 
The maximum recorded shell length is 47 mm.

Habitat 
Minimum recorded depth is 134 m. Maximum recorded depth is 2926 m.

References

External links

Cassidae
Gastropods described in 1889